Mahant Raja Ghasi Das was ruler of the princely state of Nandgaon in the present-day  Rajnandgaon District of  Chhattisgarh, India.

In 1865, the British recognised Mahant Ghasi Das as the ruler of Nandgaon. He was conferred the title of Feudal Chief of Rajnandgaon and given Sanad, a right to adoption at a later time.

Museum
Mahant Ghasidas Museum is an archaeological museum and among the ten oldest in India. The two-storey structure was built in 1875 by Ghasi Das and renovated in 1953, after the State had ceased to exist, by the former queen, Jyoti Devi, and her son, Digvijai Das. The new building of the museum was inaugurated by the first president of India, Rajendra Prasad.

References

Administrators in the princely states of India
History of Chhattisgarh
1820 births
1883 deaths